Maurice Jean Leonard Loustau-Lalanne is a Seychellois politician who served as the Minister of Finance, Trade, Investment and Economic Planning. He was appointed by President Danny Faure on 26 April 2018 and served until 29 October 2020. He was previously the Minister of Tourism in January 2016.

References

Living people
Seychellois people of French descent
Finance Ministers of Seychelles
Trade ministers of Seychelles
Tourism ministers of Seychelles
Government ministers of Seychelles
Year of birth missing (living people)
United Seychelles Party politicians